Yeghishe Charents (March 13, 1897 – November 27, 1937) was an Armenian poet, writer and public activist. Charents' literary subject matter ranged from his experiences in the First World War, the Russian Revolution, and frequently Armenia and Armenians. He is recognized as "the main poet of the 20th century" in Armenia.

An early proponent of communism and the USSR, the futurist Charents joined the Bolshevik Party and became an active supporter of Soviet Armenia, especially during the period of Lenin's New Economic Policy (NEP). However, he became disillusioned with direction of the Soviet Union under Joseph Stalin. He was arrested by the NKVD during the 1930s Great Purge, and was killed or died in 1937. However, after Stalin's death, he was exonerated in a 1954 speech by Anastas Mikoyan and was officially rehabilitated by the Soviet state in 1955 during the Khrushchev Thaw.

Biography

Early life

Yeghishe Charents was born Yeghishe Abgari Soghomonyan in Kars (Eastern Armenia, then a part of the Russian Empire) in 1897 to a family involved in the rug trade. His family hailed from the Armenian community of Maku, Persian Armenia. He first attended an Armenian elementary school, but later transferred to a Russian technical secondary school in Kars from 1908 to 1912. He spent much of his time in reading. In 1912, he had his first poem published in the Armenian periodical Patani (Tiflis). In 1915, amid the upheavals of the First World War and the Armenian genocide in the Ottoman Empire, he volunteered to fight in a detachment on the Caucasian Front.

Political and literary development
Sent to Van in 1915, Charents was witness to the destruction that the Turkish garrison had laid upon the Armenian population, leaving indelible memories that would later be read in his poems. He left the front one year later, attending school at the Shanyavski People's University in Moscow. The horrors of the war and genocide had scarred Charents and he became a fervent supporter of the Bolsheviks, seeing them as the one true hope for the salvation of Armenia.

Charents joined the Red Army and fought during the Russian Civil War as a rank and file soldier in Russia (Tsaritsin) and the Caucasus. In 1919, he returned to Armenia and took part in revolutionary activities there. A year later, he began work at the Ministry of Education as the director of the Art Department. Charents would also once again take up arms, this time against his fellow Armenians, as a rebellion took place against Soviet rule in February 1921. One of his most famous poems, I love the sun-sweet taste of the fruits of Armenia, a lyric ode to his homeland, was composed in 1920-1921. Charents returned to Moscow in 1921 to study at the Institute of literature and Arts founded by Valeri Bryusov. In a manifesto issued in June 1922, known as the "Declaration of the Three," signed by Charents, Gevorg Abov, and Azad Veshtuni, the young authors expressed their favour of "proletarian internationalism". In 1921-22 he wrote "Amenapoem" (Everyone's poem), and "Charents-name'", an autobiographical poem. Then, Charents published his satirical novel, Land of Nairi (Yerkir Nairi), which became a great success and repeatedly published in Russian in Moscow during the life of poet. In August 1934 Maxim Gorky presented him to the Soviet writers' first congress delegates with Here is our Land of Nairi.
 
The first part of Yerkir Nairi is dedicated to the description of public figures and places of Kars, and to the presentation of Armenian public sphere. According to Charents, his Yerkir Nairi is not visible, "it is an incomprehensible miracle: a horrifying secret, an amazing amazement". In the second part of novel, Kars and its leaders are seen during World War I, and the third part tells about the fall of Kars and the destruction of the dream.

In 1924-1925 Charents went on a seven-month trip abroad, visiting Turkey, Italy (where he met Avetik Isahakyan), France, and Germany. When Charents returned, he founded a union of writers, November, and worked for the state publishing house from 1928 to 1935.

In September 1926, on a street in Yerevan, Charents shot and slightly wounded a woman, Marianna Ayvazyan, the sister of composer Artemi Ayvazyan, after she had resisted his advances on several occasions. He was convicted and sentenced to eight years in prison for the shooting, but served just over a year of his sentence.

In 1930 Charents's book, "Epic Dawn", which consisted of poems he wrote in 1927-30, was published in Yerevan. It was dedicated to his first wife Arpenik.

His last collection of poems, "The Book of The Way", was printed in 1933, but its distribution was delayed by the Soviet government until 1934, when it was reissued with some revisions. In this book the author lays out the panorama of Armenian history and reviews it part-by-part. William Saroyan met him in 1934 in Moscow and thereafter described him as a courtly, brilliant man who was desperately sad.

Charents also translated many works into Armenian, including "The Internationale."

Last years and death

Excepting few poems in journals, Charents could publish nothing after 1934 (at the same time, in December 1935 Stalin asked an Armenian delegation how Charents is).

In July 1936, when Soviet Armenian leader Aghasi Khanjian was killed by Lavrentiy Beria, Charents wrote a series of seven sonnets. After Komitas's death he wrote one of his last great works, "Requiem Æternam in Memory of Komitas" (1936).

Actress Arus Voskanyan told about her last visit to Charents: "He looked fragile but noble. He took some morphine and then read some Komitas. When I reached over to kiss his hand he was startled". He became a morphine addict under the pressure of the campaign against him and because he was suffering from colic, caused by a kidney stone. The hypodermic needle Charents used for his habit is on exhibit in his museum in Yerevan.

A victim of the Yezhovschina, he was charged for "counterrevolutionary and nationalist activity" and imprisoned during the Great Purge. He died or was killed on November 29, 1937 under unclear circumstances. It is unknown where his body was buried. All his books were also banned. Charents' younger friend Regina Ghazaryan buried and saved many of his manuscripts.

Personal life
His first wife was Arpenik Ter-Astvadzatryan, who died in 1927. In 1931 Charents married Izabella Kodabashyan. They had two daughters, Arpenik and Anahit (b. 1935).

Legacy

Rehabilitation
After Stalin's death, Anastas Mikoyan called for the rehabilitation of Charents in a speech in Yerevan on 11 March 1954. The speech preceded Nikita Khrushchev's "Secret Speech" by two years and set the stage for Charents' official rehabilitation on 9 March 1955, as well as Mikoyan's behind-the-scenes rehabilitation efforts with Soviet Armenian leaders. Charents' home at 17 Mashtots Avenue in Yerevan was turned into the Yeghishe Charents House-Museum by Soviet Armenian authorities in 1975. The Armenian city Charentsavan was named after him.

After his rehabilitation, Soviet authorities also issued a commemorative stamp of 40 kopecks honoring Charents in 1958. Another commemorative stamp of 150 Armenian drams as well as a commemorative coin of 100 Armenian drams were issued by the Republic of Armenia in 1997. The new Republic of Armenia currency denomination for 1000 drams carried on one of its two sides the photo of Charents and a famous quotation in Armenian of one of his poems: (Armenian) "Ես իմ անուշ Հայաստանի արեւահամ բարն եմ սիրում" (I love the sun sweet taste of Armenia). Pope Francis during his visit to Armenia in 2016 recited a passage from that poem of Charents.

Translations, tributes, critical works
Charents' works were translated by Valeri Bryusov, Anna Akhmatova, Boris Pasternak, Arseny Tarkovsky, Louis Aragon, Marzbed Margossian, Diana Der Hovanessian, and others. William Saroyan wrote a short story about Charents in his 1971 book, Letters from 74 rue Taitbout or Don't Go But If You Must Say Hello To Everybody.

The first monograph on Charents was published by Simon Hakobyan (1888–1937) in 1924 in Vienna. Among the other researchers of Charents' poetry during that period were Paolo Makintsyan, Harutyun Surkhatyan, Tigran Hakhumyan. After his death, both Charents' works and scholarly works on him were banned for 17 years. In 1954, Norayr Dabaghyan (who previously attacked Charents in the 1930s) published the monograph Yeghishe Charents. In the following decades, research on Charents was published by Hakob Salakhyan, Suren Aghababyan, Garnik Ananyan, Almast Zakaryan, Anahit Charents, David Gasparyan and others.

A chapter in Marc Nichanian's Writers of Disaster: Armenian Literature in the Twentieth Century focuses on the question of mourning in the poetry of Charents. The edited book Charents: Poet of the Revolution, co-authored by Nichanian and Vartan Matiossian, includes a collection of scholarly articles about different aspects of Charents' poetry. Krikor Beledian's Haykakan futurizm (Armenian Futurism, 2009) includes Charents in the study of the development of Futurism in three major centers of Armenian communities: Constantinople from 1910 to 1914; Tbilisi from 1914 to 1923; and Yerevan from 1922 to 1924.

Works
"Three songs to the sad and pale girl...", poems (1914)
"Blue-eyed Homeland", poem (1915)
"Dantesque legend", poem (1915–1916)
"Soma", poem (1918)
"Charents-Name", poem (1922)
"Uncle Lenin", poem (1924)
"Country of Nairi" (Yerkir Nairi) (1926)
"Epical Sunrise", poems (1930)
"Book of the Way", poems (1933–34)

See also

Armenian genocide

Notes

Further reading

External links
Yeghishe Charents House-Museum in Yerevan
Yeghishe Charents, biography, by Shant Norashkharian 
Yeghishe Charents, By Eddie Arnavoudian, Groong.Com 
Charents Izabella Movsesovna, wife Yeghishe Charents (rus)

1897 births
1937 deaths
20th-century Armenian writers
20th-century Armenian poets
Armenian communists
Great Purge victims from Armenia
Soviet rehabilitations
People from Kars
Armenian male poets
Russian military personnel of World War I
Soviet military personnel of the Russian Civil War
Soviet poets
Members of the Communist Party of the Soviet Union executed by the Soviet Union